National Highway 128A, commonly referred to as NH 128A is a national highway in India. It is a secondary route of National Highway 28.  NH-128A runs in the state of Uttar Pradesh in India.

Route 
NH128A connects Mohammadpur azamgarh-, gaura Badshapur and Jaunpur in the state of Uttar Pradesh.

Junctions  

  Terminal near Mohammadpur.
  Terminal near Jaunpur.

See also 
 List of National Highways in India
 List of National Highways in India by state

References

External links 

 NH 128A on OpenStreetMap

National highways in India
National Highways in Uttar Pradesh